The Styrian Grand Prix was a Formula One motor racing event held at the Red Bull Ring, named after Styria, the province of Austria in which the circuit is located. Created in 2020 to maximize the number of Grands Prix during seasons affected by the COVID-19 pandemic, the Styrian event has been held as a double-header with the Austrian Grand Prix  at the same circuit on consecutive weekends.

History

The COVID-19 pandemic in 2020 led to disruption of the original race calendar, with a number of events cancelled. The Styrian Grand Prix was added to the revised calendar as a "one-off" race, like several other new or returning Grands Prix, in order to make up for the loss of other races. After the 2020 Austrian Grand Prix, it was the second consecutive race at the Red Bull Ring. Mercedes's Lewis Hamilton qualified on pole and won the race.

Red Bull's Max Verstappen qualified on pole and went on to win the race.

Winners 
All Styrian Grands Prix were held at the Red Bull Ring.

References

 
Formula One Grands Prix
Motorsport in Austria
Recurring sporting events established in 2020
2020 establishments in Austria